Arthur Henrique Ramos de Oliveira Melo (born 12 August 1996), known as Arthur Melo or simply Arthur, is a Brazilian professional footballer who plays as a midfielder for Premier League club Liverpool, on loan from Serie A club Juventus.

Born in Goiânia, Arthur began his career with Grêmio, and won the Copa Libertadores in 2017. He signed for Barcelona for an initial fee of €31 million in 2018. Arthur joined Italian club Juventus in 2020. On 1 September 2022, Arthur joined Liverpool on a 1 year loan.

Arthur made his senior debut for Brazil in 2018 after previously being capped by Brazil youth team at under-17 level. He was later part of the squad that won the 2019 Copa América.

Club career

Grêmio

Arthur began his career with his hometown club Goiás at age of 12. In 2010, after being spotted in a youth tournament, he moved to Grêmio.

In January 2015, following his impressive performances at the Copa São Paulo de Futebol Júnior, Arthur was promoted from Grêmio's youth team under first-team manager Luiz Felipe Scolari. He unexpectedly started in his first team debut, against Aimoré for the Campeonato Gaúcho. However, he was substituted at half-time by Argentine full-back Matías Rodríguez and made no more senior appearances that season. In 2016, Arthur made his league debut in the last match of the season, a 1–0 home loss against Botafogo, replacing Kaio in the second half.

In 2017, Arthur become a first-team regular after a string of good performances in Primeira Liga and Campeonato Gaúcho. In his Copa Libertadores debut, a 1–1 away draw against Club Guaraní, he was named man-of-the-match after completing 40 passes, with an impressive 100% success rate. His playing style and build earned drawn comparisons with Spanish midfielders Andrés Iniesta and Thiago, and attracted interest from European clubs such as Chelsea, Barcelona and Atlético Madrid. In May, Arthur scored his first professional goal, the opener in a 3–1 victory against Fluminense for the Copa do Brasil. In July, he scored his first league goal, the second in a 3–1 away victory against Vitória. In November, was elected by Conmebol the man of match in the second leg of the Copa Libertadores final against Lanús, despite playing only 50 minutes due to an injury.

Barcelona
On 11 March 2018, Barcelona reached an agreement with Grêmio for the transfer of Arthur Melo . The Spaniards agreed to pay an initial fee of €31 million plus €9 million in added variables. Arthur signed a six-year contract and was officially announced as a Barça player on 9 July 2018. On 28 July, Arthur scored a goal on his debut against Tottenham Hotspur in a pre-season friendly match.

Arthur made his competitive debut at the 2018 Supercopa de España on 12 August, in which Barcelona won 2–1 over Sevilla. Arthur made his league debut during the first league match of the season, also registering his first assist for the club in a 3–0 win against Alavés. On 31 August 2019, Arthur scored his first goal for Barcelona in 2–2 away draw against Osasuna.

Juventus
On 29 June 2020, Barcelona announced that they had reached an agreement with Juventus for the transfer of Arthur on a five-year contract for €72 million, plus €10 million in variables; the deal was also coordinated with a swap of Miralem Pjanić. He made his club and Serie A debut on 27 September, coming on as substitute in a 2–2 away draw against Roma.

Loan to Liverpool
On 1 September 2022, Liverpool announced the loan signing of Arthur. Juventus specified that Liverpool had paid €4.5 million in loan fees, with an option to purchase the player for €37.5 million at the end of the one-year loan.

Arthur made his Liverpool debut in a 4–1 UEFA Champions League defeat to Napoli on 7 September 2022.

Arthur's Liverpool experience started with physical condition problems having been forced to train alone while he was at Juventus. To increase his playing time, he was aggregated to Liverpool U21.

International career
Arthur has represented Brazil in under-17 level. He was part of the Brazil under-17 squad selected to play in the 2013 South American Under-17 Football Championship.

On 15 September 2017, Arthur received his first senior call-up to the Brazil squad to face Bolivia and Chile for the 2018 FIFA World Cup qualification. In May 2018, he was named in the standby list for the 2018 FIFA World Cup.

He made his international debut against United States in a 2–0 friendly win on the 7th of September 2018 coming on as a substitute. The Brazilian's first start was against El Salvador in a 5–0 win on the 12th of September.
Tite praised the midfielder's playing style saying, "He always finds the best escape, the best pass out". Even if he doesn't provide the assist, he comes up with the pass that will help a player."

In May 2019, Arthur was included in Brazil's 23-man squad for the 2019 Copa América on home soil. In the 2019 Copa América Final against hosts Peru on 7 July, at the Maracanã Stadium, Arthur assisted Gabriel Jesus's match-winning goal towards the end of the first half; the match eventually ended in a 3–1 victory to Brazil.

Arthur scored his first senior international goal for Brazil on 17 November 2020, the opener in an eventual 2–0 away win over Uruguay in a 2022 FIFA World Cup qualifier.

Style of play

Arthur is capable of playing as a deep-lying playmaker, central midfielder, box-to-box midfielder, and occasionally also as a holding midfielder. His agility, technical ability, dribbling and movement – both on and off the ball – allow him to create space and control the flow of play in midfield, whilst his exceptional vision, playmaking ability, and precise passing allow him to retain possession, create chances, and make decisive passes for teammates. In 2020, former midfielder Enzo Maresca stated that he felt Arthur was best suited to the roles of either an attacking midfielder or a mezzala.

Career statistics

Club

International

As of match played 17 November 2020. Brazil score listed first, score column indicates score after each Arthur goal.

Honours
Grêmio
Copa do Brasil: 2016
Copa Libertadores: 2017
Recopa Sudamericana 2018
Campeonato Gaúcho: 2018, 2019

Barcelona
La Liga: 2018–19
Supercopa de España: 2018

Juventus
 Coppa Italia: 2020–21
 Supercoppa Italiana: 2020

Brazil
Copa América: 2019

Individual
Campeonato Brasileiro Série A Team of the Year: 2017
Campeonato Brasileiro Série A Best Newcomer: 2017
South American Footballer of the Year: 2017 (3rd place)
Copa América Team of the Tournament: 2019
FIFA FIFPro World11 nominee: 2019 (11th midfielder)

References

External links

 Profile at the Liverpool F.C. website
 
 

1996 births
Living people
Sportspeople from Goiânia
Brazilian footballers
Brazil youth international footballers
Brazil under-20 international footballers
Brazil international footballers
Association football midfielders
Grêmio Foot-Ball Porto Alegrense players
FC Barcelona players
Juventus F.C. players
Liverpool F.C. players
Campeonato Brasileiro Série A players
La Liga players
Serie A players
Premier League players
2019 Copa América players
Copa Libertadores-winning players
Copa América-winning players
Brazilian expatriate footballers
Expatriate footballers in Spain
Brazilian expatriate sportspeople in Spain